Luiz Carlos Bombonato Goulart, known as Luizão (born 14 November 1975), is a Brazilian football pundit and retired footballer, who played as a forward.

He was capped 12 times by Brazil, scoring two goals in the last game of the 2002 FIFA World Cup Qualification vs Venezuela, a 3–0 Brazilian victory. This victory classified Brazil to the World Cup and confirmed Luizão as part of the victorious squad coached by Luiz Felipe Scolari, conquering the fifth world title for Brazil.

Career 
Luizão was born in Rubinéia. He is one of the few players, alongside Antônio Carlos, Müller, Neto and César Sampaio that played for the four major clubs of São Paulo: Santos Futebol Clube, Sociedade Esportiva Palmeiras, Sport Club Corinthians Paulista and São Paulo Futebol Clube. He managed to be the top goalscorer of at least one tournament for each one of them, except for Santos, where he underachieved.

Luizão bloomed at Guarani Futebol Clube, playing alongside close friends Djalminha and Márcio Amoroso. Luizão (with Djalminha) was then transferred to Palmeiras, where he won many titles, including a São Paulo State Championship under the command of Vanderlei Luxemburgo, where he scored 22 of 102 squad goals.

He then followed Djalminha to La Liga's Deportivo de La Coruña, but unlike the talented playmaker, Luizão failed to settle. He returned to Brazil to Club de Regatas Vasco da Gama. In July 2002, he had another unsuccessful abroad stint, with German Bundesliga side Hertha BSC, leaving the side in January 2004.

The 35-year-old forward, who was a free agent after terminating his contract with São Caetano. He came to sign with other teams as Guaratinguetá,  but has not played in any match for them.

Career statistics

Club

International

Honours

Club 
Paraná
Campeonato Paranaense: 1993

Palmeiras
Campeonato Paulista: 1996

Vasco da Gama
Campeonato Carioca: 1998
Copa Libertadores: 1998

Corinthians
Campeonato Brasileiro Série A: 1999
Campeonato Paulista: 1999, 2001
Torneio Rio-São Paulo: 1999
FIFA Club World Cup: 2000

São Paulo
Campeonato Paulista: 2005
Copa Libertadores: 2005

Flamengo
Copa do Brasil: 2006

International 
Brazil
FIFA World Cup: 2002
Summer Olympic bronze medal: 1996

Individual 
Bola de Prata (Brazilian Silver Ball): 1994
Copa do Brasil Top Scorer: 1996
Copa Libertadores Top Scorer: 2000

References

External links 

Living people
1975 births
Footballers from São Paulo (state)
Brazilian footballers
Association football forwards
Brazil international footballers
Brazil under-20 international footballers
2002 FIFA World Cup players
Copa Libertadores-winning players
FIFA World Cup-winning players
Olympic medalists in football
Medalists at the 1996 Summer Olympics
La Liga players
Bundesliga players
Deportivo de La Coruña players
Olympic footballers of Brazil
Footballers at the 1996 Summer Olympics
Olympic bronze medalists for Brazil
Campeonato Brasileiro Série A players
Campeonato Brasileiro Série B players
Sport Club Corinthians Paulista players
Hertha BSC players
Botafogo de Futebol e Regatas players
CR Flamengo footballers
Grêmio Foot-Ball Porto Alegrense players
Guarani FC players
Paraná Clube players
Sociedade Esportiva Palmeiras players
Santos FC players
São Paulo FC players
CR Vasco da Gama players
Nagoya Grampus players
Guaratinguetá Futebol players
Rio Branco Esporte Clube players
Associação Desportiva São Caetano players
J1 League players
Brazilian expatriate footballers
Brazilian expatriate sportspeople in Spain
Expatriate footballers in Spain
Brazilian expatriate sportspeople in Japan
Expatriate footballers in Japan
Brazilian expatriate sportspeople in Germany
Expatriate footballers in Germany